The University of Wales, Newport, was a university based in Newport, South Wales, before the merger that formed the University of South Wales in April 2013. The university had two campuses in Newport, Caerleon on the northern outskirts of the city, which was subsequently closed during July 2016, and a £35 million campus on the east bank of the River Usk in Newport city centre which opened in 2011. In 2012 the university was ranked 111th out of 120 UK universities in the Guardian League Table for university rankings, 105th out of 116 in The Complete University Guide and 104th out of 116 UK universities in the Times Good University Guide.

History
Newport had been involved in higher education since 1841. Originally a mechanics' institute, set up to provide further education for workers and tradesmen, it was based in Newport's Town Hall on Commercial Street. Working men and women were able to attend a variety of lectures for two shillings per quarter to study subjects including "The Pursuit of Attainment and Knowledge" and "Popular Superstition".

The institution was later formed as Gwent College of Higher Education by a merger of the Caerleon College of Education (the former Monmouthshire Training College), the Newport College of Art and Design and the Gwent College of Technology in 1975. All three former institutions had established regional and national reputations, most notably the College of Art with many of its students gaining commissions from the BBC and other major organisations in light of the college being among a select number of art colleges in the country awarded Diploma in Art and Design status.

The college became an affiliated institution of the University of Wales in 1992, being admitted as a university college in 1996 where there was a ceremony at which trumpeters of the Prince of Wales's Division played a fanfare from the top of the university clocktower and balloons were released in the faculty colours.

In May 2004, the University of Wales College, Newport secured Privy Council approval to use the title University of Wales, Newport, as a full constituent of the federal university.

On 1 August 2011, the university was restructured, creating two new faculties, each containing three schools:

The Faculty of Arts and Business
 School of Design, Engineering, Fashion and Technology
 School of Film, Photography and Digital Media
 Newport Business School

The Faculty of Education and Social Sciences
 School of Education
 School of Humanities and Lifelong Learning
 School of Sport, Health and Applied Social Sciences

The Centre for Community and Lifelong Learning (CCLL) continued to be based in Tredegar and focused on the university's work to widen participation within the Heads of the Valleys and the wider Gwent region. CCLL was also a key deliverer of the UHOVI (Universities, Heads of the Valleys Institute) project in partnership with the University of Glamorgan and Further Education Colleges.

Notable dates

 1841 Opening of Mechanics' Institute, Newport
 1872 Classes in Art and Science begin under the Free Library Committee
 1882 New building opened in Dock Street, Newport
 1886 Teacher training classes begin
 1891 Newport Technical School opened
 1898 New premises opened at 24 Bridge Street. Separation of Art Department and Science, Technology & Commerce. Two Heads appointed.
 1899 Clarence Place land bought from Lord Tredegar
 1909 Foundation stone laid at Clarence Place
 1910 Newport Technical Institute opened at Clarence Place
 1912 Foundation stone laid at Caerleon Training College
 1914-18 First World War One: 12 Caerleon students killed in the war
 1915 Schools of Art and Science, Technology and Commerce combined under a single principal
 1919 Newport Technical Institute renamed "The County Borough of Newport Technical College and Institute"
 1923 Ordinary National Certificates offered for the first time
 1934 Name changed to "Newport Technical College"
 1938 Higher National Certificates offered for the first time
 1939 – 45 Second World War: college used for troop lectures and evacuees. 19 Caerleon students killed in the war.
 1940 – 41 Classes run by Ministry of Labour
 1950 Board of Governors given more power to run Caerleon College of Education
 1958 Opening of Newport and Monmouthshire College of Technology which later became the Allt-yr-ynn campus. Closure of Newport Technical College. Clarence Place continued as Newport and Monmouthshire College of Art.
 1962 Female students admitted to Caerleon College of Education for the first time
 1975 Colleges merge to become "Gwent College of Higher Education". Four new faculties created.
 1985 New Art and Design building opens at Caerleon campus
 1987 First degree ceremony is held at Newport.
 1992 Fire at Caerleon campus
 1992 GCHE leaves Gwent County Council control.
 1994 Student Village opens at Caerleon campus
 1995 GCHE granted taught degree awarding powers
 1996 GCHE formally changes to University of Wales College, Newport
 2003 Becomes a full Constituent Institution of the University of Wales and is renamed the University of Wales, Newport.
 2007 Kegie building opens on the Caerleon campus.
 2011 Newport City campus opens after a £35 million investment.
 2011 Allt-yr-ynn campus closes.
 2012 Vice-chancellor, Peter Noyes, resigns his post and was replaced from 1 May by the Deputy Vice-Chancellor, Prof. Stephen Hagen, who was appointed as Acting Vice-Chancellor, to lead merger talks.
 2013 Merger with the University of Glamorgan to form the University of South Wales on 11 April 2013.
 2016 Caerleon campus closes.

Proposed "merger"
Along with the University of Glamorgan and Cardiff Metropolitan University, it was proposed by the Welsh Government that the University of Wales, Newport merge to create a single post-92 university in South East Wales.

The plans proved to be highly controversial, with Cardiff Metropolitan opposing any merger, citing the lack of a business case, concerns that the new institution (which would be the largest campus university in Britain) would simply be too big to manage properly, and the 'predatory' attitude of Glamorgan. Newport, however, welcomed the plans, providing they created a genuinely new institution. Professor Stephen Hagen, appointed Acting Vice-Chancellor by the Newport Board from 1 June 2012 to lead the merger upon the sudden resignation of Dr Peter Noyes, circulated a proposal for the new university to focus on entrepreneurialism, generating start-ups, equipping students with entrepreneurial skills and supporting the industries of South Wales, a concept which was initially well received by the Minister's Office.

In July 2012, Newport and Glamorgan announced talks to create a new University for South Wales, citing the opportunity to: "build on their respective strengths to develop a new, entrepreneurial model of higher education across south Wales". The university was dissolved on 11 April 2013 absorbed into University of Glamorgan and renamed University of South Wales.

In response to Cardiff Metropolitan's opposition to its involvement in any merger plans, Leighton Andrews (a strong proponent of mergers) threatened to forcibly dissolve Cardiff Metropolitan and hand its assets over to the new university formed by Glamorgan. Cardiff Metropolitan still demanded more evidence before committing to further talks and, in November 2012, Leighton Andrews withdrew a consultation on plans to force a merger.

City campus

The university opened a new £35 million campus in Newport's city centre formally on 10 January 2011. The project was a collaboration between the university, Newport City Council and the Welsh Assembly Government operating through Newport Unlimited, the urban regeneration company for the city.

The campus is situated on the western side of the River Usk in the city centre and it was the first phase of an intended £50m development for the university. It housed the Faculty of Arts and Business whilst the Caerleon campus housed the Faculty of Education and Social Sciences. The campus was part of a major redevelopment of Newport city centre. The old city campus at Allt-yr-yn was closed and demolished.

Reputation
The university had been involved in higher education since 1841. In 2009, it was rated the number one university in Wales for enterprise education by the Knowledge Exploitation Fund.

The School of Film, Photography and Digital Media taught a documentary photography degree programme as well as housing the Newport Film School, founded by John Grierson in 1966 and producing many award-winning film-makers since then.

The 2010 CILECT Congress (the international association for film and television schools) unanimously voted in Newport Film School as a full member – only two of the ten new applicant schools for full membership were given this accolade.

Facilities
The accommodation facilities on the Caerleon campus consisted of 661 rooms with a choice of standard or en-suite facilities. En-suite halls were arranged into flats of five rooms whilst the standard halls had approximately 15 residents per floor. Bedrooms were centrally heated and equipped with furniture, whilst hall kitchens were equipped with standard kitchen appliances.

The university had a sports centre housing a large sports hall, a gym/fitness suite and outdoor pitches and courts. The university library was open seven days a week and computer suites were open 24 hours a day.

Students' Union
Newport Students' Union was the union representing all students at the university. From the moment students enrolled they were automatically a member of the Students' Union. It was intended that for every year of every course there should have been at least one course representative. The union was run day-to-day by a team of sabbatical officers – students who were taking an extra year or year out from their studies to develop the union. Alongside this sabbatical team full-time and part-time staff were employed to assist in the operation of the union and part-time officers, team captains, society presidents and student managers who all worked alongside their studies to assist the union.

Newport Students' Union provided a range of sports teams, societies and entertainment for students to get involved in. The union also housed a newspaper (NewsPort), magazine (newtwo), TV station (NTV) and radio station (Radio Noize), all of which students managed and ran.

As well as weekly social events and club nights, the union organised Freshers' Fortnight, Freshers' Fayre, Re: Freshers Week, RAG (Raising and Giving Week) and the May Ball which has previously had headline acts including Supergrass, Girls Aloud, Electric Six, Scouting for Girls, The Zutons and Feeder.

Notable alumni

(View University of South Wales for further alumni ) 
Christopher Chung Shu-kun, BBS, JP, a member of Hong Kong Legislative Council
Roger Cecil
Ken Elias (born 1944), artist
 Tom Gately, writer, director and cameraman
Harry Greene, television personality
Paul Groves (born 1947), poet
Philip John
Kirk Jones, director
Natasha Rhodes, science fiction author
Asif Kapadia
Justin Kerrigan
Jon Maguire songwriter and former member of the duo Lilygreen & Maguire
Tracey Moberly
Teddy Soeriaatmadja
Ian Watkins, former singer in the rock band Lostprophets; convicted sex offender
Green Gartside, the frontman of the band Scritti Politti
 Helen Murphy, author
 Bernard Baldwin, MBE, founder of the Nos Galan road race

See also
Newport Technical Institute, the landmark former Newport Art College building

References

External links

 
1841 establishments in Wales
Educational institutions established in 1841
Newport
Buildings and structures in Newport, Wales
Landmarks in Newport, Wales
History of Newport, Wales
Educational institutions disestablished in 2013
Defunct universities and colleges in Wales